Lexington may refer to:

Places

England
 Laxton, Nottinghamshire, formerly Lexington

Canada
 Lexington, a district in Waterloo, Ontario

United States
 Lexington, Kentucky, the largest city with this name
 Lexington, Massachusetts, the oldest municipality with this name in the United States
 Lexington, Alabama
 Lexington, California, now a ghost town
 Lexington, Georgia
 Lexington, Illinois
 Lexington, Indiana
 Lexington, Carroll County, Indiana
 Lexington, Kansas
 Lexington, Maine
 Lexington, Michigan
 Lexington, Minnesota
 Lexington, Mississippi
 Lexington, Missouri
 Lexington, Nebraska
 Lexington, New York
 Lexington, North Carolina
 Lexington, Ohio
 Lexington, Oklahoma
 Lexington, Oregon
 Lexington, South Carolina
 Lexington County, South Carolina
 Lexington, Tennessee
 Lexington, Texas
 Lexington, Virginia
 Lexington (plantation), Virginia
 Lexington, Washington
 Lexington Avenue (Manhattan), a street in New York City

Ships
 Lexington-class aircraft carrier, the first operational aircraft carrier class in the United States Navy
 Steamship Lexington, which burned and sank off the coast of Long Island in 1840
 , the name of various United States Navy ships

Other uses
 Battles of Lexington and Concord, the first battles of the American Revolutionary War
 Lexington (automobile), an early automobile
 Lexington (cigarette), a Luxembourgish brand
 Lexington (horse), a 19th-century champion racehorse
 Lexington Partners, a private equity firm
 Lexington Queen, a dance club in Tokyo
 Lexington Steele, pornographic actor
 Lexington Tower, a summit in Washington state
 The Lexington, listed on the National Register of Historic Places in Polk County, Iowa
 The Lexington (Liverpool), a residential tower in Liverpool, United Kingdom
 Lexington, the codename of a 2013 Intel Atom processor
 Lexington Stakes (Keeneland), a thoroughbred horse race held at Keeneland Race Course, Lexington, Kentucky
 Lexington Stakes (NYRA), a discontinued thoroughbred horse race last held at Belmont Park, New York in 2007

See also
 Lexington Airport (disambiguation)
 Lexington Bridge (disambiguation)
 Lexington Avenue (disambiguation)
 Lexington station (disambiguation), train stations of the name
 Lexington Street (disambiguation)